Helhesten (Danish: The Hell-Horse) was an arts and literary magazine which was published between 1941 and 1944 in Copenhagen, Denmark. It was one of the leading publications during World War II in the region.

History and profile
Helhesten was first published in Copenhagen in April 1941 during the Nazi occupation of the city. Its founders were Asger Jorn, a painter, and Robert Dahlmann, an architect. They were part of the Danish Harvest group. The magazine adopted an avant-garde approach and opposed the Nazi propaganda. Its main contributors who were supporters of German expressionism, dada and surrealism included Ejler Bille, Henry Heerup, Egill Jacobsen and Carl-Henning Pedersen. It mostly featured articles on art theory, non-Western work, literature, poetry, film, architecture, and photography in addition to the reviews of art exhibitions and biographies of Danish artists. Asger Jorn's translation of the work by Franz Kafka was serialized in Helhesten which was the first translation of Kafka into Danish. The magazine produced a total of nine issues before its closure in November 1944. It was succeeded by another magazine entitled Cobra.

See also
List of avant-garde magazines
List of magazines in Denmark

References

1941 establishments in Denmark
1944 disestablishments in Denmark
Avant-garde magazines
Danish-language magazines
Defunct literary magazines published in Europe
Defunct magazines published in Denmark
Magazines established in 1941
Magazines disestablished in 1944
Magazines published in Copenhagen
Literary translation magazines
Visual arts magazines
Literary magazines published in Denmark
Expressionist works
Surrealist works